Melham is an unincorporated community in Clark County, in the U.S. state of South Dakota.

History
A post office called Melham was in operation between 1916 and 1943. The community has the name of John Melham, a businessperson in the lumber industry.

References

Unincorporated communities in Clark County, South Dakota
Unincorporated communities in South Dakota